Beau's wrasse, Cirrhilabrus beauperryi, is a species of wrasse native to the western Pacific Ocean. Its coloration varies, ranging from light blue to pink. It can be found in the aquarium trade.

Etymology
The specific name honours Beau Perry, the son of Claire and Noel Perry who support Conservation International,

References

Beau's wrasse
Taxa named by Gerald R. Allen
Fish described in 2008